Lenzburg railway station is a railway station in the municipality of Lenzburg in the Swiss canton of Aargau. 

The station is located on the Heitersberg line, part of the Zurich to Olten main line, to the west of the junction with the Rupperswil–Immensee line and to the east of the junction with the Zofingen–Wettingen line. The Seetal line, which, despite being a standard gauge Swiss Federal Railways line, retains some characteristics of a roadside tramway, terminates at a platform across the street from the main station.

The station was closed in 1984 and that line dismantled.

Services 
The following services stop at Lenzburg:

 Aargau S-Bahn:

References

External links 
 
 Station map (German, PDF, 1.8 MB)

Railway stations in the canton of Aargau
Swiss Federal Railways stations